Walter S. Trumbull (1880–1961) was an American sportswriter in the 20th century.

He resided in Newtown, Connecticut.  He attended Trinity College, where he excelled as a member of the football team, playing nearly every position at one time or another.

He was a nationally syndicated sports columnist, appearing in a variety of publications. He worked as sports editor of the New York Sun.

Trumbull died in 1961.

References

1880 births
1961 deaths
Trinity College (Connecticut) alumni
Trinity Bantams football players
American sportswriters
People from Newtown, Connecticut